The Lame Devil (UK: The Devil Who Limped; original title: , French for "the devil with a limp") is a 1948 French black-and-white historical film written and directed by Sacha Guitry. A biography of the titular French diplomat Talleyrand (1754–1838), it stars Guitry in the lead role. Originally forbidden by the French censor and turned into a play, the film went on to be released into six languages.

Film

Description
The film is a 125-minute, black-and-white biography of French priest and diplomat Charles Maurice de Talleyrand-Périgord (1754–1838), who served for 50 years under five different French regimes: the Absolute Monarchy, the Revolution, the Consulate, the Empire, and the Constitutional Monarchy. Its title comes from one of the main historical nicknames for Talleyrand, that he shares with demon king Asmodeus and English poet Lord Byron.

The movie is often noted for its opening sequence: after showing the birthplace of Talleyrand as it became in then-contemporary 1948 Paris, it moves to a bookstore window showcasing his main biographies, including a copy of Guitry's own Le Diable boiteux that creates a mise en abyme.

The film then sketches Talleyrand through a dozen episodes and anecdotes, both from his public life as a politician and his private side as a womanizer. Guitry explained that he peppered the dialogues with "a very great number" of quotes from most historical figures depicted.

Production
Under French law, a film has to be presented to the Censorship Board in order to obtain a French film-license. During the French Fourth Republic (1946–1958), post-war regulations mandated that a movie script be submitted for approval even before filming.

As explained by Guitry in 1948, his synopsis was originally rejected by the Board: they underlined various dialogues in the script as being liable to cause public outrage. Guitry scoffed that all of them were actual quotes he had lifted from Talleyrand, Napoleon, and other historical figures, but his film being in effect forbidden, he immediately adapted it into a play, Talleyrand (1948). He then leveraged the fact that his play had received success and caused no trouble to re-submit his script to the Board, who granted its license though "without any good grace".

Reception
Le Diable boiteux was originally released on 29 September 1948 in two theaters (the Marignan and the Marivaux) in Paris, France. It has since been released (dubbed or subtitled) into at least 5 other languages, being alphabetically: English (The Lame Devil), Finnish (Rampa paholainen), Greek (Pringips talleyrandos), Italian (Il diavolo zoppo), and Portuguese (Um Homem Diabólico).

Positive or negative, critics have often considered Guitry's movie to be as much a historical biography as a plea for himself or a self-defense. Because Guitry didn't stop writing and playing during the Nazi occupation of France, he had been accused of collaboration with the enemy and imprisoned two months in 1944 by a self-appointed militia; released by the new government and fully discharged in 1947, he had expressed regret at the absence of a formal trial. Thus, rehabilitating the controversial Talleyrand (often considered a traitor for serving five different regimes) was seen as Guitry also trying to rehabilitate himself and strike back at those who had criticised him: on the movie's release, both a negative review by author  (in L'Ordre, 1948) and a positive one by author René Barjavel (in France Hebdomadaire, 1948) commented on it from that standpoint. Various later reviews have discussed that aspect of the movie, from TV listings magazine Télérama (1978) to author  in Cahiers du cinéma (1988), long after the events.

According to French stage director and stage historian  in his 800-page monography Sacha Guitry. Cent ans de théâtre et d'esprit (1985), translated: "The time has come to do justice to this excellent film (very coldly received, of course, by the politicized press of the time), almost always fascinating, that rehabilitates a historical figure too often maligned and brings us back the great Sacha Guitry at the top of his game as an actor and director, if not author."

Data

Credits

Main credits
 Director: Sacha Guitry
 Script, adaptation, dialogues: Sacha Guitry (after his play Talleyrand, 1948)
 Cinematography : Nicolas Toporkoff
 Music: Louis Beydts
 Production manager: 

Other credits
 Assistant directors: , Jeanne Etiévant
 Editing: Jeannette Berton
 Film sets: René Renoux
 Cameraman: Marcel Franchi
 Sound: 
 Production company: Union Cinématographique Lyonnaise (UCIL)
 Distributor: Compagnie Parisienne de Location de Films (CPLF) and Gaumont

Cast

Main cast, in credits order
 Sacha Guitry as Talleyrand
 Lana Marconi as Madame Grand (Talleyrand's wife)
 Émile Drain as Napoleon I of France (and one lackey)
 Henry Laverne (billed "Henry-Laverne") as Louis XVIII of France (and one lackey)
 Maurice Teynac as Charles X of France (and one lackey)
 Philippe Richard (billed "Philippe-Richard") as Louis Philippe I (and one lackey)
 Georges Spanelly as Count of Montrond
 Robert Dartois as Count of Rémusat
 Renée Devillers as Duchess of Dino
 Georges Grey as General Caulaincourt
 Jeanne Fusier-Gir as Marie-Thérèse Champignon (the female conspirator)
 José Noguero as Duke of San Carlos
 Maurice Escande as Prince of Metternich
 Jean Debucourt as Baron of Humboldt
 Pierre Bertin as Baron Nesselrode (later Count)
  as Lord Castelreagh
 André Randall (billed "Randall") as Lord Grey
 Howard Vernon as Lord Palmerston
 Jacques Varennes as General Lafayette
 Maurice Schutz as Voltaire
 José Torres (billed "José Torrès") as Don Juan d'Azcona
 Pauline Carton as the female chiromancer
 Denis d'Inès as Don Basilio (in The Barber of Seville)
 Jean Piat as Figaro (in The Barber of Seville)
 André Brunot as Dr. Bartolo (in The Barber of Seville)

Uncredited cast, alphabetically
 Renée Bouzy as (unspecified)
 Georges Bréhat as (unspecified)
 Jean-Claude Briet as a lackey
 Anne Campion as Pauline de Dino (Talleyrand's great-niece)
 Daniel Ceccaldi as (unspecified)
 Jane Daury as a Spanish woman
 Dominique Davray as (unspecified)
  as a cop
 Philippe Derevel as (unspecified)
 Bernard Dhéran as Almaviva (in The Barber of Seville)
  as Rosine
 Robert Favart as abbot Dupanloup
 Catherine Fonteney as Princess of Chalais
  as the lady's companion
 Robert Hossein as a guest dressed in white
 Pierre Lecocq as Count Roederer
 Michel Lemoine as Prince of Asturias (later Ferdinand VII of Spain)
 Simone Logeart as (unspecified)
 Sophie Mallet as the maid
 Michel Nastorg as a lackey
 Georges Rivière as Marquis de la Tour de Bournac
 Robert Seller as Prince of Polignac
 Léon Walther as Dr. Cruveilhier

Release

Release
 Original title: Le Diable boiteux
 Genre: historical film
 Country of origin: France
 Language: French
 Released: 29 September 1948 (France), 1948 (World)

Specifications
 Runtime: 125 minutes
 Photography: black-and-white
 Film: 35 mm
 Image ratio: 1.37:1
 Sound mix: mono

References

Sources
Primary sources
  Guitry, Sacha (1948). Le Diable boiteux. Scènes de la vie de Talleyrand (play script), Paris: Éditions de l'Élan, Preface (text at Amis-Talleyrand.fr; also reprinted in some of his other books, including: Le Cinéma et Moi, 1977, Ramsay, p. 186–187) — Narrates the film's genesis and censorship.

Secondary sources
  Savia, Roberto, ed. (online). , in Sacha Guitry, l'ironie d'un Maître, un Maître de l'ironie (website), at RobySavia.chez.com — Film data, compilation of 6 critics from 1948 to 1988.

Tertiary sources
  (as Le Diable Boiteux) — UK title.
 The Lame Devil at DVD Toile (as Le Diable Boiteux) — Complements to credits, cast, release.
  — Most credits, cast, release.

Notes

External links
 The Lame Devil at TF1 (poster, stills)
  (as Le Diable Boiteux)
 
 The Lame Devil at Dailymotion (1-minute excerpt)

1948 films
1940s biographical drama films
1940s historical drama films
French biographical drama films
French historical drama films
1940s French-language films
Films directed by Sacha Guitry
Films based on works by Sacha Guitry
French films based on plays
Biographical films about politicians
French Revolution films
Depictions of Napoleon on film
Cultural depictions of Charles Maurice de Talleyrand-Périgord
Cultural depictions of Klemens von Metternich
Cultural depictions of Gilbert du Motier, Marquis de Lafayette
Cultural depictions of Voltaire
French black-and-white films
Films set in the 19th century
Films set in the Austrian Empire
1940s French films